Terri Ann Hendrix is a Texas-based singer-songwriter, multi-instrumentalist, and independent artist who has been writing and performing an eclectic mix of Americana genre, encompassing folk, pop, country, blues, and jazz, since 1990.  Since 1998 Hendrix has been based in and near San Marcos, Texas, living as of 2021 in nearby Martindale, after growing up in San Antonio, Texas.  Hendrix has released at least 20 albums and EPs on her own Wilory Records label, co-wrote the Grammy-winning song "Lil' Jack Slade" by the Dixie Chicks, and, in 2011, published a book, Cry Til You Laugh – The Part That Ain't Art. As of 2021, Lloyd Maines, on guitars and backing vocals, has accompanied Terri Hendrix live and in recordings since 1997 and her second album.

Hendrix has cited Dolly Parton, Kate Bush, and Little Texas as early artistic influences, and Ani diFranco and John Prine as inspirations for producing and releasing her recordings independently instead of through a traditional record company.

Known for her live shows and positive energy, Terri Hendrix says that she lives by the adage "own your own universe," a lyric from one of her earliest songs. In addition to writing and performing, Hendrix conducts songwriting workshops both in and beyond Texas, and has established the community "Wilory Farm Center for the Creative Arts" on her farm in the San Marcos area, housing the OYOU ("Own Your Own Universe") nonprofit, which offers educational and therapeutic arts programs, including for those who face neurological challenges or physical disabilities.  Hendrix has named both her home "Wilory Farm" and her label "Wilory Records" in honor of her late mentor Marion Williamson's own "Wilory [goat] Farm" in Stonewall, Texas.  For some years through 2021, "Wilory Farm" has also been home to Hendrix's beloved pets, including several goats, several dogs, and Niem, a “donkey who thinks he’s a goat”.

Terri Hendrix has long had focal epilepsy, which makes it difficult to tour, especially by air.  In 2019–2020, she was diagnosed with essential vocal tremor, likely related to her epilepsy.  Despite this vocal limitation, during the first two years of the COVID-19 pandemic, Hendrix and Maines frequently live-streamed concerts from her home, released her 20th recording, conducted classes and workshops, and in fall 2021, started again performing occasional live concerts in Texas.  In late 2021, Hendrix has stated that she is likely to limit herself to six formal live concerts per future year, due to her vocal issue.

Discography, etc.

Album and extended play (EP) recordings
 Two Dollar Shoes (Tycoon Records, 1996; Wilory Records, 1998 - remixed & remastered)
 Wilory Farm (1998)
 Live (1999)
 Places in Between (2000)
 Live in San Marcos (2001)
 Friendswood and Beyond (live "official bootleg", 2001)
 The Ring (2002)
 The Art of Removing Wallpaper (2004; remixed & remastered 2012)
 Celebrate the Difference (2005)
 The Spiritual Kind (2007)
 The Spiritual Kind on the Road (live "official bootleg", 2007)
 Left Over Alls (retrospective, 2008)
 Christmas on Wilory Farm (EP; 2008)
 Cry Till You Laugh (2010)
 Love You Strong (Project 5.1) (2016)
 The Slaughterhouse Sessions (Project 5.2) (2016)
 Talk to a Human (Project 5.3) (2019)
 Who is Ann? (Project 5.4) (EP, 2019)
 Pilgrim's Progress (Project 5.5) (2021)
All self-released on Wilory Records and produced by Lloyd Maines, with some co-produced by Terri Hendrix, except for the initial (1996) release of Two Dollar Shoes.

Compilation, etc., recordings
 Highway Prayer: A Tribute to Adam Carroll (Eight 30 Records, 2016), "Red Bandana Blues" (Adam Carroll cover)
 Dreamer: A Tribute to Kent Finlay (Eight 30 Records, 2016) - "I'll Sing You a Story" (Kent Finlay cover) 
 A Very Blue Rock Christmas, Vol. 1 (Blue Rock Performing Arts Center, 2013) - "Do you Hear What I Hear" (Regney Noel/Shain Gloria Adele cover)
 Absolutely Positively Getting Along (Big Brothers and Big Sisters of Bucks County/Cool Beans, 2013) - "First Place"
 This One’s for Him: A Tribute to Guy Clark – (Music Road/Icehouse Music, 2011) – "The Dark" (Guy Clark cover)
 Tucson Folk Festival/KXCI Compilation (Tucson Folk Festival/KXCI, 2011) – "Monopoly"
 Lone Star Sampler Volume 5 (Lone Star Music, 2010) – "Hand Me Down Blues"
 Freight Train Boogie 2: A Collection of Americana Music (Jackalope Records, 2009) – "Posey Road Stomp"
 Voices of a Grateful Nation, Vol. 2: Texas Country and Americana (Welcome Home Project/Icehouse Records, 2008) – "Motherless Children"
 Putumayo Presents: Americana (Putumayo World Music, 2007) – "Prayer for My Friends"
 Putumayo Kids Presents: Animal Playground (Putumayo World Music, 2007) – "Eagles"
 Sin City Social Club Volume 9 (Sin City Social Club, 2007) – "Jim Thorpe’s Blues"
 Kids Corner WXPN 20th Anniversary (WXPN Philadelphia, 2007) – "Nerves"
 Recording Artists for Hope: The Katrina CD, Vol. 1 (Wonderboy, 2005) – “My Own Place”
 Ten in Texas (Icehouse Music, 2005) – “Cowboy” (Betty Elders cover)
 Big Sweet Life: The Songs of Jon Dee Graham (Freedom Records, 2005) – “Something Moves” (Jon Dee Graham cover)
 95.9 The Ranch Texas Music Series '04 (KFWR Fort Worth, 2004) – “Walk on Me“
 Texas Unplugged Vol.1 (Palo Duro Records, 2004) – “Clicker”
 KUT-FM Live Set (KUT Austin, 2004) – “Old Joe Clark”
 Broadcasts Vol. 12 (KGSR Austin, 2004) – "One Way”
 Don't Mess With Texas Vol.2 (Texas Music Project, 2004) – "It's About Time”
 Parkinsong Volume One: 38 Songs Of Hope (ParkinSong Foundation, 2004) – “Goodbye Charlie Brown”
 Damn It’s 2 Early: More Music From the Dudley & Bob Show (KLBJ-FM Austin, 2003) – “Wallet”
 Performing Songwriter: Editor's Choice Top 12 Independent Releases, Volume 10 (Performing Songwriter magazine, 2003) – “I Found the Lions”
 Latin Playground (Putumayo World Music, 2002) – “Lluvia De Estrellas”
 Open Doors: A Musical Project of Faith, Love, and Hope to Benefit Parkinson’s Research (2002) – “Eagles”
 LJT's Texas Music Festival No. 13 Live (Larry Joe Taylor's Texas Music Festival, 2002) – “Wallet”
 Inside the Music of Texas — Vol. 1 (Texas Music magazine, 2002) – “It’s a Given”
 Lone Star Sampler Volume 1 (Lone Star Music, 2001) – “Walk On Me”
 Kerrville Folk Festival: 30th Anniversary Video, Volume 1 (Kerrville Folk Festival, 2001) – “Invisible Girl”
 Moments of Grace — A.R.T.S. for People (A.R.T.S. for People [Dallas, TX], 2001) – “Moon on the Water”
 Mixed Grill: A Collection of Austin Music, Volume 1 (Texas Music Roundup, 2001) – “Flowers”
 Kerrville Folk Festival CD (Kerrville Folk Festival KFF2000 V1, 2000) – “Goodtime Van”
 Celebrating Rounder’s 30th Anniversary (Rounder Records/Continental Record Services, 2000) – “The Know How”
 LJT's Texas Music Festival No. 12 Live (Larry Joe Taylor's Texas Music Festival, 2000) – “The Know How”
 Travelin' Texas, Volume 1 (Institute for the History of Texas Music, Southwest Texas State University, 2000) – “My Own Place”
 Live @ The World Cafe, Volume 11 (WXPN Philadelphia, 2000) – “Places in Between”
 Blue Highways: The Ultimate Americana Music Fest (Continental Record Services, 2000) – “Gravity”
 Broadcasts Vol. 8 (KGSR Austin, 2000) – “Goodtime Van”
 Broadcasts Vol. 7 (KGSR Austin, 1999) – “Gravity”
 Live @ The World Cafe, Volume 9 (WXPN Philadelphia, 1998) – “Gravity”
 Landmarks (Continental Record Services/Rounder Records Europe, 1998) – “The Know How”
 SXSW Artists' CD (South By Southwest, 1998) – “Sister Song”
 KUT-FM Live Set (KUT Austin, 1998) – “Sister Song”

Books
 Cry Till You Laugh – The Part That Ain't Art (Wilory Records, 2010; revised 2012)

Awards 

 GRAMMY Award for Best Country Instrumental Performance, 2002, for co-writing the Dixie Chicks song "Lil' Jack Slade"
 Texas Music magazine
 Top 50 Albums in Texas History – Wilory Farm
 Austin Chronicle Austin Music Awards Music Poll
 Best Folk Act
 Best Singer-Songwriter
 Best New Band
 Austin American-Statesman Austin Music Critics' Poll
 Best New Artist
 San Antonio Current Music Awards/Best of San Antonio
 Best Folk/Acoustic and Best Country Band
 Songwriter of the Year
 Female Entertainer of the Year
 Female Vocalist of the Year
 Honors
South Texas Walk of Fame
St. Mary's University Art of Peace Award
 Distinguished Alumnus, Hardin Simmons University
 San Marcos Women's Hall of Fame

See also
 Music of Austin

References

External links
Official website

1968 births
Living people
American women country singers
American country singer-songwriters
Musicians from Austin, Texas
American country guitarists
Country musicians from Texas
Singer-songwriters from Texas
Guitarists from Texas
20th-century American guitarists
20th-century American women guitarists
21st-century American women